Carlos Alberto de Almeida Jr. known as Carlinhos (born 17 June 1980), is a Brazilian footballer who plays for Bangu.

Career 
Carlinhos started his career at Flamengo. In 2005, he left for Belgian First Division club Standard de Liège.

After played once in 2008-09 season, Carlinhos was released by Swiss club FC Aarau.

In August 2011 he returned to Brazil for Bangu.

References

External links
CBF 
Swiss Football League profile 

1980 births
Living people
Brazilian expatriate footballers
Association football midfielders
CR Flamengo footballers
Brasiliense Futebol Clube players
CR Vasco da Gama players
Standard Liège players
FC Aarau players
Belgian Pro League players
Swiss Super League players
Expatriate footballers in Belgium
Expatriate footballers in Switzerland
Footballers from Rio de Janeiro (city)
Brazilian footballers